The 2019 Koser Jewelers Tennis Challenge was a professional tennis tournament played on outdoor hard courts. It was the thirteenth edition of the tournament which was part of the 2019 ITF Women's World Tennis Tour. It took place in Landisville, Pennsylvania, United States between 5 and 11 August 2019.

Singles main-draw entrants

Seeds

 1 Rankings are as of 29 July 2019.

Other entrants
The following players received wildcards into the singles main draw:
  Katharine Fahey
  Raveena Kingsley
  Jamie Loeb
  Sophia Whittle

The following player received entry as a special exempt:
  Catherine Harrison

The following players received entry from the qualifying draw:
  Alison Bai
  Elysia Bolton
  Lizette Cabrera
  Victoria Duval
  Angelina Gabueva
  Claire Liu
  Maria Sanchez
  You Xiaodi

The following players received entry as lucky losers:
  Ayaka Okuno
  Julia Rosenqvist

Champions

Singles

 Madison Brengle def.  Zhu Lin, 6–4, 7–5

Doubles

 Vania King /  Claire Liu def.  Hayley Carter /  Jamie Loeb, 4–6, 6–2, [10–5]

References

External links
 2019 Koser Jewelers Tennis Challenge at ITFtennis.com
 Official website

2019 ITF Women's World Tennis Tour
2019 in American tennis